Palompon (IPA: [pɐlom'pɔn]), officially the Municipality of Palompon, is a 2nd class municipality in the province of Leyte, Philippines. According to the 2020 census, it has a population of 58,313 people.

History 

Along the strip of the fertile coast, the community was founded circa 1620 and originally named Hinablayan.  Fish, sea shells, and other marine products abounded. People fished along the shore with arrows tied to vines. Its abundance attracted not only migrants but also Moro raiders from the south. Legend tells that local defenders used to hang the dead bodies of Moros on tree branches so that the place come to be known as Hinablayan (from the word sablay which means "to hang").

The legend continues that when the Spaniards came they saw floating at the bay a cluster (pong pong) of mangrove propagules locally known as "Tungki", they decided to change the name of Hinablayan to Paungpung, after the cluster of mangrove propagules to erase the bloody memory of the Moro raiders. Gradually the name evolved to Palompong, then to Palumpun, and its current spelling of Palompon sometime in 1700 or 1800. It is said that cluster later got stuck to the shoal until they grew up as trees, forming an islet which is Tabuk Island today.

In 1737, Jesuit missionaries arrived and built the first chapel which was later burned during a Moro raid. It was rebuilt and, as a refuge from attack, the chapel was enclosed with piled stones, with a "cota" along the frontage. When the people saw Moro vintas coming, the big church bell would ring the alarm and people rushed inside the church, fighting back with bows and arrows and spears.

The place assumed the role of cabeceria of all the municipalities in the north-western side of Leyte during the Spanish regime. At that time Palompon was under the parish of Hilongos. The parish priest visited the place occasionally for marriage, baptism and masses.

The Jesuits, later succeeded by the Augustinians, built the present church with 300 natives, who were forced labor without pay. If one or some of the laborers were unable to work, they were substituted by others just to maintain the quota every day for the next thirty years. The structure soon became a landmark of Palompon, reputed to be the oldest church in Leyte. On November 12, 1784, Palompon obtained its parochial independence from Hilongos.

Sometime in late 17th century, there was a nine-day battle between the Palomponganons and Moro raiders during which the residents rushed to the stone church (newly completed at that time) and took refuge for more than a week. The Moros suffered losses in that encounter and were defeated. A cannon in the town's plaza is a relic of that battle.

Ormoc remained part of Palompon parish from 1784 until 1851, when finally it was declared as an independent parish. Villaba and Matag-ob were both part of the territorial jurisdiction of this town as well before they obtained their municipio (pueblo) status.

In 1957 the barrios of Santo Rosario, Santa Rosa, Balagtas, San Vicente and Mabini were separated from the municipality of Palompon and constituted into Matag-ob.

Geography

Climate

Barangays

Palompon is politically subdivided into 50 barangays, 

10 of which are poblacion barangays with an area of approximately 1 square kilometer; the other forty 40 barangays are distributed along the coastline and in the interior rural and mountainous areas.

Demographics

Language 
Cebuano (Kana dialect) is widely spoken in Palompon but you may hear a few who speak Waray-Waray as there are students coming from different towns/cities from the eastern part of the region that are native Waray-waray speakers.

Economy

Tourism

Kalanggaman Island
A quiet and remote location ideal for the cruise ship passengers looking for a place to relax and unwind. It is for its magnificent sandbars, both stretching at the end of the island. Unlike other beach resorts, this island is not always crowded. Activities on the island include swimming in its crystal blue beach, snorkeling to see its majestic underwater gems, and kayaking.

Tabuk Marine Park and Bird Sanctuary
A 10-minute boat ride from the Palompon island perfect for tourists looking for simplicity and beauty with the mangroves and preservation of the surroundings. Kayaking is the way to tour the islet.

Palompon Eco-Terrestrial Adventure Park
In November 2016, the park opened to visitors along with some activities such as Duathlon Race, Trail Run and Long Board exhibition & competition.

Lantaw
A small hill on the southwest end of Palompon. Recommended for visitors who want a quick hike to witness a view of the town.

Other attractions:
Palompon Church
Buenavista Underwater Caves
Tabuk Marine Sanctuary

Education

Palompon has 2 tertiary institutions:

 Palompon Institute of Technology
 Northern Leyte College

It also has 12 secondary institutions:

Public

 Palompon National Highschool
 Lomonon National Highschool
 Tinabilan National Highschool
 Alfredo Parilla National Highschool (San Miguel)
 Taberna National Highschool
 Cantuhaon National Highschool
 San Guillermo National Highschool

Private

 PIT Laboratory Highschool (Semi-Public)
 Colegio de San Francisco Javier
 NLC Laboratory Highschool
 Ace Learning Center Inc.
 PromisedLand Educational Academy Inc.

References

External links 

 [ Philippine Standard Geographic Code]
2015 Census data
Local Governance Performance Management System 

Municipalities of Leyte (province)